The Streets of Paris is a musical revue featuring Bobby Clark, Luella Gear, Abbott and Costello and Carmen Miranda, debuted on May 29, 1939 in Boston and on June 19, 1939 in New York. Had two hours and-a-half, with the interval. The musical was staged from June 1939 to 10 February 1940, totaling 274 presentations.

Production 
Olsen and Johnson in partnership with Lee Shubert were working on their newest musical revue, The Streets of Paris. The first rehearsals for the show began on May 2, 1939 in New York. Before going to New York, Streets of Paris debuted in Boston on May 29, 1939, obtaining a great success of criticism and public. Some of the city newspapers speculated that the show had been extended in more a week.

Debuted on June 19, 1939, in the Broadhurst Theatre on Broadway, Manhattan, New York. The show introduced Carmen Miranda to the American public, and marked the debut of Abbott & Costello, Gower Champion and Jeanne Tyler in Broadway musicals.

The musical was divided into two acts with songs written by Jimmy McHugh and Al Dubin, working for the first time together. The sketches were written by Tom McKnight, Charles Sherman and Jay S. Kaufman, with costumes designed by Irene Sharaff, scenery for the show was designed by Larry Goldwasser, with direction of choreography by Robert Alton, and directed by Edward Dowling Duryea.

The Streets of Paris ended their presentations in New York in February 1940, starting then a tour by East Coast American, through Philadelphia, Washington DC, Pittsburgh, Toronto, Detroit, Cleveland and Chicago, where was closed on May 8, 1940.

Cast 

Featured artist:

Luella Gear
Bobby Clark
Abbott and Costello
Carmen Miranda

Secondary artists: (in alphabetical order)

Adele Murphy
Alice Anthony
Betty Bartley
Ben Dova
Billy Branch & Co.
Bernice Smith
Claire Anderson
Cliff Hall
Charles Hoffman
Daisy and Violet Hilton
Edward Wells
Eileen O'Day
Enis Beyer
Evelyn Hylton
Flora Bowes
Frances O'Day 
Gloria Gilbert
Grete Natzler (as Della Lind)
Gower & Jeanne
Halldis Prince
Henning Irgens 
Hugh Ellsworth
Jackie Gateley
Janice Nicholson
Jo & Jeanne Readinger
John McCauley
Kalli Barton 
Kate Hylton 
Lincoln Bouvier
Lincoln Wilmerton
Lu Ann Meredith
Magdi Kari
Margo Hylton 
Margaret Irving
Margaret Hall 
Mary Ann Parker
Maxine Martin
Mischa Pompianov
Mildred Hall 
Milton Watson
Nancy Grace 
Olive Nicholson
Peggy Gallimore
Richard D'Arcy 
Ruth Merman
Sadella Wagner
Sharlie Hall
Sidney Marion (as Sid Marion)
Thelma Temple
Trudy Burke
Yvonne Bouvier
Ward and Van

Musical numbers 
Act I
Theatre Marigny Dressing Room ... The Callboy, Costumer, Wardrobe Mistress, Girls.
The Streets of Paris ... Enis Beyer, Lynda Grey, Margaret Hall, Mildred Hughes, Nancy Lewis, Maxine Martin, Frances O'Day, Halldis Prince.
The Ensemble Speaks ... Mesdemoiselles: Claire Anderson, Mary Ann, Alice Anthony, Betty Bartley, Kalli Barton, Flora Bowes, Trudy Burke, Jackie Gateley, Peggy Gallimore, Lu Ann Meredith, Ruth Merman, Adele Murphy, Janice Nicholson, Olive Nicholson, Eileen O'Day, Mary Ann Parker, Thelma Temple.
Messieurs: Norman Abbott, Edward Browne, Richard D'Arcy, Hugh Ellsworth, William Hawley, Henning Irgens, Mortimer O'Brien, Mischa Pompianov, Edward Wells.
In Paris ... Luella Gear, Margaret Irving, John McCauley.
Thanks for the Francs ... Milton Watson, Margo, Kate and Evelyn Hylton.
The Photographer ... Jackie Gately, Buddy Roberts, John McCauley, Luella Gear, Bobby Clark.
Danger in the Dark ... Della Lind, Milton Watson with Jo & Jeanne Readinger, Hugh Ellsworth, Richard D'Arcy and Edward Wells.
The Queen of Paris ... Luella Gear, Gower Champion.
Three Little Maids ... Margo, Kate and Evelyn Hylton.
Is It Possible: A Moment in Montmartre ... Bobby Clark, Della Lind with Madge and Billy Branch & Co.
Rendezvous Time in Paree ... Milton Watson, Yvonne Bouvier with Kalli Barton, Luann Meredith, Mary Ann Parker, Olive Nicholson, Adele Murphy, Alice Anthony, Betty Bartley, Jackie Gately.
Monsieur Think A Drink Hoffman ... Bernice Smith, Sadella Wagner, Mischa Pompianov, Richard D'Arcy.
The Convict's Return ... Luella Gear, Bobby Clark.
South American Way ... Carmen Miranda.

Act II
History Is Made at Night ... Enis Beyer, Halldis Prince, Maxine Martin, Nancy Grey, Margart Hall, Mildred Hall, Frances O'Day.
A Noel Coward Custom ... Bobby Clark, Margaret Irving, Luella Gear.
We Can Live on Love ... Milton Watson, Yvonne Bouvier with Gower and Jeanne, Claire Anderson, Gloria Gilbert.
Robert the Roue ... Bobby Clark.
Rest Cure ... Sid Marion, Cliff Hall, Margaret Irving, John McCauley, Lincoln Wilmerton, Hennings Irgens, Frances O'Day, Hugh Ellsworth, Enis Beyer, Edward Wells, Jackie Gateley.
The Spy ... Bobby Clark, Luella Gear, Lincoln Bouvier, John McCauley and Edward Wells.
Reading Writing and A Little Bit Of Rhythm ... Margo, Kate, Evelyn Hylton with Jo & Jeanne Readinger, Gower and Jeanne.
Three Little Maids, Later ... Margo, Kate and Evelyn Hylton.
That's Music ... Cliff Hall, Sid Marion, Bobby Clark.

Finale
The French Have A Word For It ... Bobby Clark, Luella Gear, Sid Marion, Cliff Hall, Carmen Miranda.

References

External links
 

1939 musicals
Broadway musicals
Revues